Dave Parker (1934/35 – 9 November 2018) was a professional rugby league footballer who played in the 1960s having played rugby union at county level in the 1950s.

Born in Barrow in Furness, Parker played rugby union while a student at Manchester University and captained both Manchester and the Lancashire representative team before turning professional with Oldham in August 1960.  During his rugby union career he made 24 appearances for Lancashire and was considered one of the best number eights in the country.

In a career with Oldham he captained the club to the semi-finals of the 1963-64 Challenge Cup and winning the second division championship in the same season.  He made 198 appearances for Oldham, scoring 34 tries, before an injury in the opening game of the 1967–68 Northern Rugby Football League season against Liverpool City ended his playing career.

Parker died on 9 November 2018.

References

External links
Statistics at Oldham Rugby League Heritage Trust

Great Britain national rugby league team players
2018 deaths
Oldham R.L.F.C. players
Rugby league locks
1930s births
Rugby league players from Barrow-in-Furness
Rugby union number eights
Lancashire County RFU players